= Mark Magnuson =

American biologist

Mark A. Magnuson is an American biologist, currently the senior associate dean for research and the Louise B. McGavock Professor of Molecular Physiology and Biophysics, Medicine, and Cell and Developmental Biology at Vanderbilt University.
